Combestone Tor is a granite tor on Dartmoor, England. The tor is considered a popular destination for tourists.

References

External links 

Dartmoor
Tors of Dartmoor